Mountain Music is the sixth studio album by American country music group Alabama, released in 1982. A crossover success, it ranked well as an album on both country and pop charts and launched singles that were successful in several markets. This is Alabama's most successful studio album. In 1998, the album was certified 5× Platinum by the Recording Industry Association of America. It peaked at No. 1 on the Billboard Country Albums chart and No.14 on the Billboard 200.

Early LP pressings of this album were mastered at a slower speed.  Reissues made after have corrected this error.

Track listing

Note: The BMGSP reissue of this album replaces the full versions of "Mountain Music" and "Take Me Down" with their single edits.

Personnel

Alabama
 Jeff Cook - vocals, lead guitar, and fiddle, lead vocals on "Green River" and "Lovin' You Is Killin' Me"
 Teddy Gentry - vocals and bass guitar, lead vocals on "Never Be One"
 Mark Herndon - drums and percussion
 Randy Owen - lead vocals and rhythm guitar

Owen, Cook and Gentry share lead vocals on "Gonna Have a Party" and one verse of "Mountain Music"

Additional musicians
 Hayward Bishop - drums
 Mark Casstevens - background vocals, guitar
 Michael Douchette - harmonica
 Jack Eubanks - guitar
 David Hanner - guitar
 David Humphreys - drums
 George Leo Jackson - guitar
 Jerry Kroon - drums
 Rodger Morris - keyboards, Synclavier II, Emulator, Prophet 5
 Fred Newell - guitar
 Larry Paxton - bass guitar
 William Rainsford - keyboards
 Dale Sellers - guitar
 W. David Smith - bass guitar
 Bruce Watkins - banjo

String arrangements by Kristin Wilkinson

Production
 Paul Goldberg - engineer
 Randy Kling - mastering
 David Lebon - photography
 Gene Rice - engineer
 Norman Seeff - photography
 Harold Shedd - producer, engineer

Chart performance

Album 
Mountain Music charted No. 1 on Billboard's Country Albums chart in 1982 and reached No. 14 on the all-genre Billboard 200 chart the same year. It won 1982's Grammy Award for "Best Country Performance by a Duo or Group with Vocals".

Singles 
The album produced three hit singles, with the title song "Mountain Music" reaching No. 1 on the Billboard Hot Country Singles chart. The other two singles were successful in several markets: "Take Me Down", a No. 1 country hit, reached No. 18 on the Billboard Hot 100 and No. 5 on the Billboard Adult Contemporary Singles chart. "Close Enough to Perfect" charted No. 1 on the Hot Country Singles and No. 65 on the Billboard Hot 100.

Certifications

Notes 

Alabama (American band) albums
1982 albums
RCA Records albums
Albums produced by Harold Shedd